The Charles S. Mott Prize was awarded annually by the General Motors Cancer Research Foundation as one of a trio of scientific prizes entirely devoted to cancer research, the other two being the Charles F. Kettering Prize and the Alfred P. Sloan, Jr. Prize. The prizes, worth US$250,000, were awarded annually between 1979 and 2005. The awards were generally considered the most prestigious in the field.

The Mott Prize was awarded for "the most outstanding recent contribution related to the cause or prevention of cancer". In 2006, due to financial pressures on the corporation supporting the Foundation, the three awards were consolidated into a single $250,000 General Motors Cancer Research Award.. In 2006, the first and only winner of the General Motors Cancer Research Award was Napoleone Ferrara.

Since 2006 no further prizes have been awarded.

Laureates

See also

 List of medicine awards

References

American science and technology awards
Cancer research awards
Charles Stewart Mott
General Motors